The Junior Women's Hockey League is an ice hockey league established in 2007 by Bill Driscoll and Kush Sidhu, coaches of North American Hockey Academy and the Washington Pride, respectively, in order to provide opportunities for young females to develop into collegiate student-athletes. U19, U16 and U14 divisions are sanctioned by the JWHL.

History 
A successful league since its first season, the JWHL has seen hundreds of players sign with NCAA Division I or Division III schools since 2007. Over 20 JWHL players have skated for the U.S., Canadian, Czech, and Japanese Under-18 National teams. The JWHL was developed to bring together teams that regularly produce NCAA calibre players. The league started with four teams, expanding to 12 teams in 2012-13. Ten teams will compete in the 2017-18 season.

Season competition 
Currently, each team plays all the other teams three times during the regular season (27 games in the 2017-18 season). All teams also compete in the JWHL Challenge Cup (see below). Following the regular season, a playoff is held to determine the JWHL Champion.

Games are played with three 20-minute stop-time periods with ice typically being resurfaced between periods. Most games in the US are played on college campuses. Games are played by USA Hockey or Hockey Canada rules depending on the location of the venue.

JWHL Challenge Cup
The JWHL's premier event takes place in mid-February with the hosting of the JWHL Challenge Cup. The Challenge Cup brings together all of the JWHL teams as well as invited teams from across the US and Canada.  The Challenge Cup has been hosted by the Washington Pride in the Washington, D.C. area, who are supported by the NHL's Washington Capitals.

Teams

Champions

Elizabeth 'Liz' Turgeon Memorial Player of the Year Award
 2010–11: Haley Skarupa, (Washington Pride)
 2011–12: Haley Skarupa (Washington Pride)
 2012–13: Annie Pankowski (North American Hockey Academy)
 2013–14: Jaycee Gebhard (Athol Murray College Notre Dame)
 2014–15: Shae Labbe (Warner Hockey School)
 2015–16: Carlee Turner (North American Hockey Academy)
 2016–17: Veronika Pettey (Washington Pride)
2017–18: Emma Wuthrich (North American Hockey Academy)

Season results

See also
 United States women's national U-18 ice hockey team
 Canada women's national U-18 ice hockey team

References

External links
JWHL website
Balmoral Hall School Blazers
Boston Shamrocks
 North American Hockey Academy Winter-Hawks
 Pacific Steelers
 Washington Pride

4
4
Amateur ice hockey
Youth ice hockey leagues in Canada